Seven ships of the British Royal Navy have been named HMS Pheasant:

 , a 14-gun sloop. Originally French (Faisan), captured April 1761 by HMS Albany. Foundered in the English Channel in  October 1761.
 , a 12-gun cutter armed with 12 x 4-pounder guns. Bought in 1778. Capsized in the English Channel on 20 June 1781.
 , an 18-gun sloop by Edwards of Shoreham, launched 17 April 1798. Sold on 11 July 1827.
 , an  4-gun, wooden screw gunboat by W & H Pitcher of Northfleet launched on 1 May 1856. She took part in the Royal Fleet Review of 23 April 1856 and was broken up in August 1877 at Northfleet.
 , a 6-gun, composite screw gunboat built at Devonport Dockyard, launched on 10 April 1888. Armed with 6 × 4 in guns. Sold on 15 May 1906.
 , an  built by Fairfield, launched 23 October 1916. Sunk by a mine off Orkney on 1 March 1917.
 , a  sloop launched in December 1942.

References
 

Royal Navy ship names